HMS Somerset is a Type 23 frigate of the Royal Navy. She is the eleventh ship of the class to join the fleet since 1989. She was built by Yarrow Shipbuilders Ltd on the River Clyde, in Scotland and was launched in June 1994 by Lady Elspeth Layard, wife of then 2nd Sea Lord Admiral and Commander-in-Chief Naval Home Command Admiral Sir Michael Layard. She entered service in 1996.  Lady Layard is the ship's sponsor. She is named after the Dukedom of Somerset.

The fourth Somerset to serve in the Royal Navy, she has inherited four battle honours from previous ships of the name; Vigo Bay (1702), Velez Malaga (1704), Louisburg (1758) and Quebec (1759). The previous ships all served during the 18th century and ensured that the name Somerset played a significant part in that period of naval history.

Somersets home port is HMNB Devonport. The ship has the Freedom of the City of Wells and is also affiliated with the County of Somerset, the Worshipful Society of Apothecaries, the 2nd and 4th Battalions of The Rifles (inherited from affiliation with the Royal Green Jackets), TS Weston and TS Queen Elizabeth Sea Cadet Units, Downside, Baytree and Helles Schools, Bridgwater College and the Somerset Legion House of The Royal British Legion.  The 19th Duke of Somerset takes a keen interest in the ship and is a regular visitor, and the ship also hosted Harry Patch, Simon Weston (in place of Johnson Beharry) and Marcus Trescothick whilst docked at Avonmouth for a remembrance service to launch the 2008 British Legion Poppy Appeal.

Operational history

1996–2000
On 2 November 1999, Somerset returned briefly to Sierra Leone to stand by for a possible evacuation of British nationals during a breakdown in the peace talks, though after several days of the talks resumed and Somerset was withdrawn.

2001–2010
In 2007, the first at-sea firing trials of the UK Royal Navy's new 30mm DS30M Mark 2 Automated Small Calibre Gun system were completed by Somerset.

On 18 February 2009, Somerset sailed from Devonport as part of the Taurus 09 deployment under Commander UK Amphibious Task Group, Commodore Peter Hudson. She was joined on this deployment by landing platform dock  as Hudson's flagship, landing platform helicopter , Type 23 frigate  and four ships of the Royal Fleet Auxiliary.

In May 2010 she sailed for Operation Telic, conducting boarding operations and oil platform protection operations in the Persian Gulf.

2011–present
On 3 May 2012, she began a refit at the Devonport Royal Dockyard operated by the Babcock International Group. The refit was expected to take nine months. She took part in Exercise Joint Warrior 2013. In January 2015, Somerset took part in the search for the crew of the Cyprus-registered cement carrier , which had capsized in the Pentland Firth.

In Autumn 2015, she carried out security patrols in support of the European Heads of Government meeting in Malta. In November 2015, Somerset visited Valencia - the first Royal Navy ship to do so in a number of years. While there, she met a delegation led by Juan Carlos Valderrama Zurián, the Central Government Representative for the Valencia region, and hosted a lunch to thank representatives of various Armed Forces charities for their work. In December 2015, she returned to port after performing guard duties at the 2015 CHOGM.

Somerset was again tasked with escorting a Russian vessel in May 2017 when she monitored the  Krasnodar as it transited the English Channel. Somerset was awarded the 'Fleet Frigate Effectiveness Trophy' for 2017. A Royal Navy press release said; "HMS Somerset has been awarded the accolade for being the most successful and versatile of all of the Royal Navy’s frigates, which are widely considered to be the workhorses of the fleet."

Somerset began a major upgrade in November 2018 and returned to service in March 2022. In August 2022, it was reported that the ship had suffered a "major systems failure" and had to be tied up in Rosyth for investigation and potential repair. However, pursuant to repairs, the frigate was then reported to have returned to sea later the same evening.

In January 2023, work began on installing Naval Strike Missiles on Somerset to replace the Harpoon anti-ship missiles.

Affiliations
Duchy of Somerset
The Rifles
Wells, Somerset
Worshipful Society of Apothecaries
Somerset County Council
Downside School CCF, Somerset

References

External links

 

Frigates of the United Kingdom
Military history of Somerset
Ships built on the River Clyde
1994 ships
Type 23 frigates of the Royal Navy